Won't Look Back may refer to:
Won't Look Back (album), 2002
"Won't Look Back" (song), 2014